Foss is an unincorporated community in Tillamook County, Oregon, United States. Foss is the site of an important river flood gauge.

Foss was named for Herbert Foss, who owned timber in the area. Foss post office ran from 1928 to 1943, and Foss station on the Southern Pacific Railroad (now the Port of Tillamook Bay Railroad) was established shortly after the post office. Camp Nehalem (also known as Camp Foss), a Civilian Conservation Corps (CCC) camp northeast of Foss, had a Foss mailing address.

References

External links
Foss history from VanNatta Forestry
Image of Camp Nehalem from Oregon State University Special Collections

Civilian Conservation Corps in Oregon
Unincorporated communities in Tillamook County, Oregon
1928 establishments in Oregon
Unincorporated communities in Oregon